<noinclude>

Airport link line of Shanghai Suburban Railway is a commuter rail line currently under construction in Shanghai. It runs from Hongqiao railway station in Minhang District to Shanghai East railway station in Pudong. The  express line is expected to shorten the travel time between the airports of Hongqiao and Pudong from 90 minutes (by Metro Line 2) to under 40 minutes. Construction started in June 2019. The line is expected to open at the end of 2024.

Description
Walk on the south side of S20 and S1, pass through Pudong International Airport, and then follow the north side of S32 into Shanghai East railway station. The project is divided into east and west construction. The west section is located in Minhang District, starting from Hongqiao Hub in the west and ending at the east end well of Huajing station in the east. It has a total investment of 9.549 billion yuan.

It can dig and push  a minute underground.

Operation
A rail transit style operation is adopted, with the platform design, train schedule, and other aspects being similar to metro lines. Citizens can use public transportation cards to enter and exit the station. Pudong International Airport and Resort station and the termini have a reserved length for 16-car CRH6F trains while other stations will accommodate 8-car CRH6F trains.

Proposed Stations

Service routes
 M - Mainline: Hongqiao railway station ↔ Shanghai East railway station
 T - Through line: Hongqiao railway station ↔  (through operation on )

Through operations

Important stations
In terms of operation mode, a rail transit-style bus operation is adopted. The platform design, train schedule, and other aspects are similar to subways, and citizens can use the Shanghai public transport card to enter and exit the station.

Approximately 88 percent of the line will run underground while the remaining sections will be elevated. The above-ground section is between Qibao and Huajing stations.
There are 7 underground stations and 2 above-ground stations.

Future extensions
A branch line from Shanghai South Railway Station to the Airport Link Line Sanlin South Station will be constructed.

References

Notes

Shanghai Metro lines
Proposed buildings and structures in Shanghai
Shanghai
Airport rail links in China

25 kV AC railway electrification